The 2017–18 season is PAS Giannina F.C.'s 23rd competitive season in the top flight of Greek football, 8th season in the Super League Greece, and 52nd year in existence as a football club. They also compete in the Greek Cup.

Players 
Updated:12 February 2018

International players

Foreign players

Personnel

Management

Coaching staff

medical staff

Academy

Transfers

Summer

Ιn

Out 

For recent transfers, see List of Greek football transfers summer 2017

Winter

In

Out 

For recent transfers, see List of Greek football transfers winter 2017–18

Pre-season and friendlies

Competitions

Super League

League table

Results summary

Fixtures

Greek Cup

Second round

Group G

Fixtures

Last 16

Quarter-finals

Statistics

Appearances 

Super League Greece

Goalscorers 

Super League Greece

Clean sheets

Best goal and MVP awards winners

Disciplinary record

References

External links 
 Official Website

PAS Giannina F.C. seasons
Giannina